Op Stap  is a 1935 Dutch musical comedy film directed by Ernst Winar.

Cast
Jan Blok		
Frans Boogaers		
Heintje Davids	... 	Mrs. Fortuin
Louis Davids... 	Piano Tuner
Fien de la Mar	... 	Bella Ramona
Alex De Meester		
Philip Dorn	... 	George van Reen
Ber Engelen		
Adolphe Engers	... 	Uncle Barend
Josephine van Gasteren		
Jan Hahn	... 	Man bij Operette
Fientje Koehler		
Jopie Koopman	... 	Polly Fortuin
Walter Smith		
Tini Visscher

External links 
 

1935 films
Dutch black-and-white films
1935 musical comedy films
Dutch musical comedy films
1930s Dutch-language films